Mohamed Al Hachdadi (born 2 February 1991) is a Moroccan volleyball player, member of the Morocco men's national volleyball team and Russian team, Belogorie Belgorod. 2021 Polish Champion. With his club, Al Rayyan, he competed at the 2014 Club World Championship held in Brazil.

Sporting achievements

Clubs
 FIVB Club World Championship
  Belo Horizonte 2014 – with Al Rayyan

 AVC Asian Club Championship
  Pasay 2014 – with Al Rayyan

 National championships
 2013/2014  Qatari Championship, with Al Rayyan
 2014/2015  Qatari Championship, with Al Rayyan
 2019/2020  Brazilian SuperCup, with Vôlei Taubaté
 2020/2021  Polish Championship, with Jastrzębski Węgiel

Individual awards
 2015: CAVB African Championship – Best Spiker
 2021: CAVB African Championship – Most Valuable Player

References

External links
 
 Player profile at LegaVolley.it
 Player profile at PlusLiga.pl
 Player profile at Volleybox.net

1991 births
Living people
Moroccan men's volleyball players
Moroccan expatriate sportspeople in Qatar
Expatriate volleyball players in Qatar
Expatriate volleyball players in Finland
Moroccan expatriate sportspeople in Turkey
Expatriate volleyball players in Turkey
Expatriate volleyball players in South Korea
Moroccan expatriate sportspeople in France
Expatriate volleyball players in France
Moroccan expatriate sportspeople in Italy
Expatriate volleyball players in Italy
Expatriate volleyball players in Brazil
Moroccan expatriate sportspeople in Poland
Expatriate volleyball players in Poland
Moroccan expatriate sportspeople in Russia
Expatriate volleyball players in Russia
Jastrzębski Węgiel players
Opposite hitters